Solid Ground is the first solo album from Peter Baldrachi.  The album received favorable reviews from The Big Takeover, Amplifier Magazine, The Noise, Indie Pages, and The Boston Globe,and was named one of the Top Discs of 2007 by Absolute Powerpop.

In 2008, the track "You're Gonna Miss Me Someday" appeared on Not Lame Recordings' "International Pop Overthrow, Vol. 11.

Track listing

Personnel
 Peter Baldrachi – lead vocals, drums, percussion, backing vocals
 Gary Rand – electric and acoustic guitars, lead guitar, piano, backing vocals 
 Alice Austin – backing vocals
 Steve Buonomo – bass
 Lester Goodwine – keyboards
 Richard Mirsky – electric, acoustic and lead guitar on “You’re Gonna Miss Me Someday”
 Karl Mogensen – electric guitar on “Breakdown”
 David Horak – piano on “A Better Place” and Farfisa on “Round And Round”
 Dave Leitch – bass on “Breakdown”

Production notes
 Engineered by K.R. Mogensen 
 Additional engineering by Peter Harvey, Tarek Elzeneiny and Corbin Smith
 Recorded at Kissy Pig, Allston, MA 
 Mixed by Pete Peloquin at Studio Metronome, Brookline, NH 
 Edited by Corbin Smith 
 Mastered by Jay Frigoletto at Mastersuite

References

2006 debut albums
Peter Baldrachi albums